Daniel Frahn (born 3 August 1987) is a German footballer who plays as a striker for SV Babelsberg 03.

Career

Early career
Frahn began his career with Energie Cottbus, and made one 2. Bundesliga appearance for the club, replacing Markus Dworrak in a 5–2 win over Alemannia Aachen in 2005. A year later he joined Hertha BSC, where he spent a season playing in the reserve team in the Regionalliga Nord, before making the short journey to his hometown, Potsdam, to sign for SV Babelsberg of the same division. His third season with Babelsberg was hugely successful – he finished as the league's top scorer with 29 goals, and the club finished as league champions, earning promotion to the 3. Liga.

RB Leipzig
Despite Babelsberg's promotion, Frahn opted to stay in the fourth tier, signing for big-spending RB Leipzig along with strike partner Stefan Kutschke. He was the captain of the team, and memorably scored a hat-trick to eliminate VfL Wolfsburg in the first round of the 2011–12 DFB-Pokal. He finished the 2011–12 season as Regionalliga Nord top scorer for a second time (with 26 goals), but the club missed out on promotion, finishing in second place behind Hallescher FC. In the 2012–13 season, RB Leipzig entered the re-formed Regionalliga Nordost, and won the division unbeaten, with Frahn again finishing as top scorer with 20 goals. They beat Sportfreunde Lotte in a playoff to secure promotion to the 3. Liga, although Frahn missed both legs of the tie. He scored the club's first ever 3. Liga goal, in a 1–0 win over Hallescher FC on the opening day of the 2013–14 season. His sixth goal of the season came ten seconds into a home-match against VfB Stuttgart II: seven Leipzig players stormed the Stuttgart half immediately after kick-off; the ball was played back then a long-ball was hit forward to Matthias Morys, who crossed for Frahn to score. RB Leipzig went on to win the match 3–1. Frahn ended the season as the league's secondtop scorer with 19 goals, behind SV Darmstadt 98's Dominik Stroh-Engel, as the Red Bulls were promoted to the 2. Bundesliga as runners-up.

FC Heidenheim
On 10 June 2015, it was confirmed, that Frahn had signed a contract with 1. FC Heidenheim valid from 1 July 2015.

Chemnitzer FC
He moved to Chemnitzer FC on  5 January 2016.

On 5 August 2019, Chemnitz terminated Frahn's contract with the club after accusing the player of “openly displaying” his sympathy for neo-Nazi groups.

SV Babelsberg 03
Frahn signed for his former club SV Babelsberg 03 in January 2020 as a free agent. His signing caused controversy and divided opinion amongst Babelsberg supporters due to his association with the German far-right, others supported the signing, including club president Archibald Horlitz, who said "I asked everyone in Babelsberg, life members, fans... 'do you think that Frahn is a Nazi?' and no one said yes". Then I asked, 'do you think he has right-wing views'. No one said yes". He made his debut for the club as a substitute against BSG Chemie Leipzig on 2 February 2020.

Career statistics

References

External links

Daniel Frahn profile at RB Leipzig's official site 

1987 births
Living people
Sportspeople from Potsdam
German footballers
Germany youth international footballers
Association football forwards
FC Energie Cottbus players
FC Energie Cottbus II players
Hertha BSC II players
SV Babelsberg 03 players
RB Leipzig players
Chemnitzer FC players
2. Bundesliga players
3. Liga players
Footballers from Brandenburg